The Family of Chimps (Dutch: Chimps onder elkaar) is a 1984 Dutch documentary film directed by Bert Haanstra. The film is a study of the behaviour of a family of chimpanzees in Burgers' Zoo in Arnhem in the Netherlands. The documentary was inspired by the 1982 book 
Chimpansee politiek (Chimpanzee politics) by primatologist and ethologist Frans de Waal.

1980s Dutch-language films
Films about apes
1984 films
1984 documentary films
Films directed by Bert Haanstra
The Family of Chimps
Chimpanzees
Films set in zoos
Dutch documentary films